Bidrubeh may refer to:
 Bidrubeh-ye Markazi
 Bidrubeh-ye Olya
 Bidrubeh-ye Sofla
 Bidrubeh Pumping Stations